Rónald González may refer to:

Rónald González (cyclist) (born 1981), Venezuelan professional racing cyclist
Rónald González (Costa Rican footballer) (born 1970), Costa Rican football (soccer) player
Ronald González (Chilean footballer) (born 1990), Chilean football player